Liu Zhongde (5 May 1933 – 25 May 2012) was a politician of People's Republic of China, he was a standing committee member of the 9th and 10th Chinese People's Political Consultative Conference, and a member of the 14th CCP Central Committee, he served as Minister of Culture of the People's Republic of China from December 1992 to March 1998, as deputy head of the Propaganda Department of the Chinese Communist Party from June 1990 to 1998, as deputy secretary general of the State Council from May 1988 to 1990, and vice chairman of the Ministry of Education of the People's Republic of China from June 1985 to May 1988.

Biography
Liu was born in Ji'an County, Tonghua Province, Manchukuo in May 1933, he entered Harbin Institute of Technology in 1953, after graduation, he worked as a teacher in his alma mater, he was transferred to Southeast University in 1962.

In June 1985, Liu served as vice chairman of the Ministry of Education of the People's Republic of China, then served as deputy secretary general of the State Council in 1988. In 1990, he worked as a deputy head of the Propaganda Department of the Chinese Communist Party until 1998. From 1992 to 1998, he served as Minister of Culture of the People'e Republic of China.

Liu died in May 2012 in Beijing.

References

1933 births
2012 deaths
People from Ji'an
Harbin Institute of Technology alumni
Chinese Communist Party politicians from Jilin
Ministers of Culture of the People's Republic of China
People's Republic of China politicians from Jilin
Academic staff of Harbin Institute of Technology